The Wigner–Araki–Yanase theorem, also known as the WAY theorem, is a result in quantum physics establishing that the presence of a conservation law limits the accuracy with which observables that fail to commute with the conserved quantity can be measured. It is named for the physicists Eugene Wigner, Huzihiro Araki and Mutsuo Yanase.

The theorem can be illustrated with a particle coupled to a measuring apparatus. The measurable quantity is its position relative to the measuring apparatus, represented by the operator .

Mikko Tukiainen gave a generalized version of the WAY theorem, which makes no use of conservation laws, but uses quantum incompatibility instead.

References

Quantum measurement